The 2016 Asian Men's Handball Championship was the 17th edition of the Asian Men's Handball Championship, held from 15 to 28 January 2016 in Isa Town and Manama, Bahrain. It acted as the Asian qualifying tournament for the 2017 World Championship.

Qatar secured their second consecutive title by defeating Bahrain 27–22 in the final. The bronze medal was captured by Japan, by beating Saudi Arabia 25–16.

Draw

Preliminary round
All times are local (UTC+3).

Group A

Group B

Knockout stage

5th place bracket

9–11th place semifinal

5–8th place semifinals

Semifinals

Ninth place game

Seventh place game

Fifth place game

Third place game

Final

Final standing

References

External links
Asian Handball Federation
Results at todor66

2016
Asian Men's Handball Championship
Asian Men's Handball Championship
2016 Asian Men's Handball Championship
January 2016 sports events in Asia